Vítor Manuel Oliveira (17 November 195328 November 2020) was a Portuguese football midfielder and manager.

In a managerial career spanning over 30 years, he won 11 promotions to the Primeira Liga, six as champion.

Playing career
Born in Matosinhos, Oliveira's senior career spanned 13 seasons, ten of which were spent in the Primeira Liga where he appeared in a total of 218 games, scoring 17 goals; he represented Leixões SC, F.C. Famalicão, S.C. Espinho, S.C. Braga and Portimonense S.C. at that level. In his last year as a professional, he played 23 matches (one goal) for the latter team as they finished fifth and qualified for the UEFA Cup for the first and only time in their history.

Oliveira retired in June 1985, at the age of 31. In the second division, he played for U.S.C. Paredes and Famalicão.

Coaching career
Oliveira was player-manager of Famalicão for their final match of the 1978–79 season, after the exit of Mário Imbelloni. The team lost 2–0 at C.F. Os Belenenses on 17 June, and were consequently relegated from the top level.

Afterwards, Oliveira was in charge of Portimonense. His first season yielded the best finish of his entire career as seventh in the 1985–86, and he was dismissed midway through the following campaign. In the following years he worked almost exclusively with F.C. Paços de Ferreira in division two, achieving promotion in 1991 as champions and retaining league status the next year.

After three full seasons in the top flight with Gil Vicente FC, Oliveira coached several clubs in the first and second divisions, promoting from the latter tier with U.D. Leiria, Belenenses and Leixões. Early into 2007–08 he replaced fired Paulo Duarte at the helm of Leiria, but only managed to lead his team to three wins in his 21 games (14 losses) as the season ended in top-division relegation.

After working with former club Leixões as director of football in 2008–09, Oliveira resumed his career in the second level, with C.D. Trofense, C.D. Aves, F.C. Arouca and Moreirense FC. On 19 May 2016, he returned to Portimonense nearly three decades after his first spell, on a one-year contract with the aim of winning promotion. After doing so as champions – his fifth consecutive promotion – he decided to remain in the Algarve; having taken the team to tenth place on their return to the top flight, he left the Estádio Municipal de Portimão in May 2018.

On 22 May 2018, Oliveira replaced João Henriques as manager of another former side, Paços de Ferreira. In May 2019, having sealed his eleventh promotion and sixth as champion, he left for yet another former employer Gil Vicente – who had been restored to the top tier in a court decision. On 10 August, in their first game of the season, they beat FC Porto 2–1 at home; they finished in tenth, after which he left.

Death and legacy
Oliveira died while going for a walk in his hometown of Matosinhos on 28 November 2020, at the age of 67; early reports, which were later confirmed, stated that he felt unwell and died of a heart attack. He had been working as a pundit for Canal 11 a few weeks prior to the event.

Afterwards, the Liga Portuguesa de Futebol Profissional decided to name the monthly and yearly Best Manager Award in his honour.

Managerial statistics

Honours

Manager
Paços Ferreira
Segunda Liga: 1990–91, 2018–19

União Leiria
Segunda Liga: 1997–98

Leixões
Segunda Liga: 2006–07

Moreirense
Segunda Liga: 2013–14

Portimonense
Segunda Liga: 2016–17

Individual
Segunda Liga Best Coach: 2014–15, 2015–16, 2016–17, 2018–19

References

External links

1953 births
2020 deaths
Sportspeople from Matosinhos
Portuguese footballers
Association football midfielders
Primeira Liga players
Liga Portugal 2 players
Leixões S.C. players
U.S.C. Paredes players
F.C. Famalicão players
S.C. Espinho players
S.C. Braga players
Portimonense S.C. players
Portuguese football managers
Primeira Liga managers
Liga Portugal 2 managers
F.C. Famalicão managers
Portimonense S.C. managers
F.C. Maia managers
F.C. Paços de Ferreira managers
Gil Vicente F.C. managers
Vitória S.C. managers
Associação Académica de Coimbra – O.A.F. managers
U.D. Leiria managers
S.C. Braga managers
C.F. Os Belenenses managers
Rio Ave F.C. managers
Moreirense F.C. managers
Leixões S.C. managers
C.D. Trofense managers
C.D. Aves managers
G.D. Chaves managers